The National Union of Postal Clerks (PLF) was a trade union representing workers at sub-post offices in Norway.

The union was founded in 1909, and affiliated to the Norwegian Confederation of Trade Unions in 1954.  By 1963, it had 2,524 members.  In 1977, it merged with the Norwegian Union of Postal Officials, to form the Norwegian Post Organisation.

References

Postal trade unions
Trade unions established in 1909
Trade unions disestablished in 1977
Trade unions in Norway